Helen Kelly may refer to:

 Helen Kelly (trade unionist) (1964–2016), President of the New Zealand Council of Trade Unions
 Helen Kelly (cyclist) (born 1971), track and road cyclist from Australia
 Helen Margaret Kelly (1884–1952), philanthropist